Kattoor Narayana Pillai (born 1946) is an artist and former chairman of Kerala Lalithakala Akademi. He has experimented with almost all media in painting during his three-decade-long career as an artist and art academician. He is the former principal of the College of Fine Arts, Thiruvananthapuram.

Life 
He was Born in Mavelikkara in 1946. Graduated from Raja Ravivarma School of Painting and Chennai Arts and Craft College. He has received the Junior Fellowship of the Central Department of Culture. He Authored a book called Rupa Parinamam in Chitrakala.

References

External links

Indian curators
Artists from Thiruvananthapuram
1946 births
Living people
Malayali people
Raja Ravi Varma College of Fine Arts alumni